A water tunnel is an experimental facility used for testing the hydrodynamic behavior of submerged bodies in flowing water.  It functions similar to a recirculating wind tunnel, but uses water as the working fluid, and related phenomena are investigated, such as measuring the forces on scale models of submarines or lift and drag on hydrofoils. Water tunnels are sometimes used in place of wind tunnels to perform measurements because techniques like particle image velocimetry (PIV) are easier to implement in water. For many cases as long as the Reynolds number is equivalent, the results are valid, whether a submerged water vehicle model is tested in air or an aerial vehicle is tested in water. For low Reynolds number flows, tunnels can be made to run oil instead of water. The advantage is that the increased viscosity will allow the flow to be a faster speed (and thus easier to maintain in a stable manner) for a lower Reynolds number.

Whereas in wind tunnels the driving force is usually sophisticated multiblade propellers with adjustable blade pitch, in water and oil tunnels the fluid is circulated with pumps, effectively using a net pressure head difference to move the fluid rather than imparting momentum on it directly. Thus the return section of water and oil tunnels does not need any flow management; typically it is just a pipe sized for the pump and desired flow speeds. The upstream section of a water tunnels generally consists of a pipe (outlet from the pump) with several holes along its side and with the end open followed by a series of coarse and fine screens to even the flow before the contraction into the test section. Wind tunnels may also have screens before the contraction, but in water tunnels they may be as fine as the screen used in window openings and screen doors.

Additionally, many water tunnels are sealed and can reduce or increase the internal static pressure, to perform cavitation studies.  These are referred to as cavitation tunnels.

Methods
Because it is a high-speed phenomenon, a special procedure is needed to visualize cavitation. The propeller, attached to a dynamometer, is placed in the inflow, and its thrust and torque is measured at different ratios of propeller speed (number of revolutions) to inflow velocity. A stroboscope synchronized with the propeller speed "freezes" the cavitation bubble. By this means, it is possible to determine if the propeller would be damaged by cavitation. To ensure similarity to the full-scale propeller, the pressure is lowered, and the gas content of the water is controlled.

Often, a tunnel will be co-located with other experimental facilities such as a wave flume at a Ship model basin.

List of water tunnels (cavitation tunnels)

Australia
"Australian Maritime College".  AMC

Brazil
 Laboratory of Naval and Oceanic Engineering (NAVAL), Institute for Technological Research ( IPT) of São Paulo.

Canada
National Research Council—Institute for Ocean Technology Cavitation Tunnel, St. John's, Newfoundland.

France
 "Tunnel de Cavitation" Ecole Navale, Lanveoc
 "Grand Tunnel Hydrodynamique" Bassin d'Essais des Carènes, Val de Reuil
 "TH8.2V : Tunnels Hydrodynamiques 8 ou 2 m3/s" Centre d'études et de recherche de Grenoble

Germany
 Multiple cavitation tunnels at the Versuchsanstalt für Wasserbau und Schiffbau, Berlin
 Cavitation tunnel at the University Duisburg-Essen, Institute of Ship Technology, Ocean Engineering and Transport Systems, University Duisburg-Essen
 Cavitation tunnel at Potsdam Ship Model Basin, Potsdam
 Large Cavitation tunnel at Hamburg Ship Model Basin, Hamburg
 Multiple cavitation tunnels at the Oskar von Miller Institut, Technical University of Munich

India
 Fluid Control Research Institute, Palakkad, Kerala. 
 Cavitation Tunnel of the Naval Science and Technology Labs at Visakhapatnam.
 Department of Aerospace Engineering, Indian Institute of Technology, Kharagpur
 Indian Institute of Technology Madras.

Iran
Applied Hydrodynamics Laboratory, Iran University of Science and Technology, Narmak, Tehran.
 Marine Engineering Laboratory, Sharif University of Technology, Azadi Av., Tehran.

Italy
 Department of Naval Architecture, University of Genoa.
 INSEAN Cavitation facility, INSEAN (National Institute of Studies and Experiments in Naval Architecture), Rome.

The Netherlands 
 Large Cavitation Tunnel and High Speed Cavitation Tunnel at Maritime Research Institute Netherlands in Wageningen
 Twente Water Tunnel facility at University of Twente

Norway
 Cavitation Lab NTNU, The Norwegian University of Science and Technology, Trondheim

Spain
CEHIPAR (Canal de Experiencias Hidrodinámicas de El Pardo), El Pardo (Madrid), Spain.

Serbia
 The Large Cavitation Tunnel at Military Technical Institute Belgrade, Serbia

Switzerland
 High Speed Cavitation Tunnel at LMH: Lab. of Hydraulic Machines, EPFL: Ecole Polytechnique Federale de Lausanne, Switzerland

Taiwan
 Large Cavitation Tunnel at National Taiwan Ocean University (國立臺灣海洋大學) from Zhongzheng, Keelung, Taiwan
 Large Cavitation Tunnel at National Cheng Kung University (國立成功大學) from East, Tainan, Taiwan
 Large Cavitation Tunnel at National Taiwan University (國立臺灣大學) from Da'an, Taipei, Taiwan also look at sea transportation in Taiwan
 Large Cavitation Tunnel at National Kaohsiung Marine University (國立高雄海洋科技大學) from Nanzih, Kaohsiung, Taiwan

Turkey
 ITÜ Cavitation Tunnel at Istanbul Technical University, Turkey

United Kingdom
 Emerson Cavitation Tunnel, University of Newcastle upon Tyne.

United States
 The Garfield Thomas Water Tunnel The Pennsylvania State University, State College, PA
 The William B. Morgan Large Cavitation Channel, Memphis, TN
 David Taylor Model Basin,  Carderock Division of the Naval Surface Warfare Center
 Water Tunnel, The University of North Carolina at Charlotte,  Charlotte, NC

See also
Wave tank
Wind tunnel

References

External links

"Under Water Speed Way..." Popular Mechanics, July 1949
Description of a commercial water tunnel showing the inlet baffle, flow conditioning screens, and converging section.
These show the clear difference between a recirculating wind tunnel and a water tunnel.
A miniature water tunnel whose return section is simply a reservoir tub with a sump pump. Flow rate is controlled by constricting the flow on the outlet of the pump with a valve.

Ship design
Model boats
Hydrodynamics
Scale modeling
Physical models